The Volkswagen Polo Mk2 and Polo Mk2F were available as supercharged G40 models - called the Volkswagen Polo G40 (sometimes also called Volkswagen Polo GT G40, Volkswagen Polo G-40, or simply Volkswagen Polo G).

Mk2
At the heart of the Polo GT G40 was its 1.3 litre G40 engine (engine ID code: PY).

Standard roadwheels were 13x5.5 ET38 silver 'Hockenheim' alloy wheels with 175/60 H13 tyres.

There have been a number of one-make race series for the Polo, starting with the 'Volkswagen Polo G40 Cup' for Mk2 (Germany) and Mk2F G40 (UK) versions. The Polo Cup championship started in 1987 with race-modified Polo G40 producing  (with a catalytic converter) and was a support race at rounds of the Deutsche Tourenwagen Meisterschaft.

Mk2F
At the time of launch of the Polo Mk2F, the highest performance model was the Polo GT with (engine ID code: 3F). Defining features of the Polo GT include red piping in the bumpers, black overhead cloth, a rev counter, wheel arch extensions and a red badge in the grille.

Soon after the launch of the Mk2F, another sporting model was added to the range — a new version of the supercharged G40, now as a full production model in all markets, rather than the limited batch of Mk2 G40s. Engine and gearbox aside, mechanical differences between the G40 and similar looking GT included  lower suspension,  vented front brake discs and rose-jointed steering and track control arms. The G40 was also marked out by its Le Mans check interior trim, roof-mounted 'bee-sting' aerial and BBS 5.5Jx13 cross-spoke alloy wheels, while the speedometer topped out at 160 mph (compared to 120 mph on the GT).

As with the previous model, Volkswagen Motorsport modified G40 Cup cars were sold for racing in a one-make series, the Volkswagen Polo G40 Cup. A handful of these original racers are still around, and compete in the Super Coupe Cup against other brands.

Sales of the G40 was marred by a comparatively high price tag (£11,568 in the UK  - equivalent to around £19,000 in 2010) and because it was based on a nine-year-old design it came with limited luxuries compared to rivals. Power steering, for example, was never an option. With the bigger, better equipped Mk2 Golf GTI 8v not much more expensive it failed to sell in large numbers. Only around 500 right hand drive models were ever made, exclusivity which combined with easy power upgrades has made it popular with enthusiasts.

The model was replaced by the Polo GTI in 1995 in Western Europe, and was not directly replaced in the UK until 2000. However, the Polo Mk4 1.4 16v was the quickest Polo for the next 6 years, followed by the GTI.

See also
Volkswagen Polo - for an overview of the Polo range
G60 - for detailed information on the G-Lader engine and subsequent forced induction developments

References

External links

Polo G40 UK Facebook Polo G40 UK Facebook Page
PoloG40.com French Polo G40 community
Club G40 - UK owners club
Polo3 - Mk1 Mk2 & Mk3 Polo owners community
www.G-Lader.info - Die Infoseite zum G-Lader
Poloheinz.de 
Volkswagen.com - official international portal
Volkswagen Classic (in german)

Cars introduced in 1986
1990s cars
Polo G40
Front-wheel-drive vehicles
Coupés
Hot hatches
Cars discontinued in 1994